Jane Doe is a character appearing in American comic books published by DC Comics. She first appeared in Arkham Asylum: Living Hell #1 and was created by Dan Slott and Ryan Sook.

Sarah Pidgeon portrayed a variation of the character in the final season of Gotham.

Fictional character biography
Jane Doe is introduced as a serial killer who observes her targets and then kills them before assuming their identity. She first appears disguised as Arkham Asylum therapist Dr. Anne Carver. When she was about to kill her latest patient, Warren White, Batman showed up and exposed Jane Doe's identity while White found the real Dr. Carver's body. Guards arrived to contain the situation, but Batman told them to stay back while he spoke to Jane. Jane stated that she wanted to look into the madness of Arkham Asylum by posing as Dr. Carver, and that by compiling her own psychological profile, she has realized that her desire to steal other people's identities is driven by a need to fill an "emptiness" within her. Jane breaks down as the guards take her back to her cell. As the notes taken by Jane Doe as Dr. Carver in the last two months are thrown out, Aaron Cash confronts Jane about what happened to her. Aware that Cash had feelings for the doctor, Jane comments that she knew Dr. Carver was disgusted by Cash losing his hand to Killer Croc and that she could never love him. Jane Doe later assumes the identity of an Arkham security guard named Wrigley and escorts Doodlebug to his cell, leaving the door ajar on purpose. Still posing as Wrigley, Jane Doe kidnaps White during a prison riot.

After the Black Glove's failed plan to destroy Batman, Jane Doe and the rest of the inmates from Arkham Asylum were transferred to Blackgate until Arkham was completely decontaminated. The second Black Mask organizes a plan of action that involves Jane Doe, Adam Bomb, Firefly, and the other escaped Arkham patients. When Commissioner James Gordon visits District Attorney Hampton's office and tries to get an arrest warrant on Two-Face, Jane Doe breaks into the office, gunning down Hampton and shooting Gordon three times as a "message from Two-Face." She was unaware that Gordon was wearing a bulletproof vest that saved his life.

During the "Brightest Day" storyline, Jane Doe was seen in Arkham Asylum at the time when Deathstroke's incarnation of the Titans entered Arkham Asylum to deal with a certain patient. After Osiris kills a guard, he unknowingly activates a switch that releases all the inmates, thus allowing Jane to escape once again.

In 2011, DC Comics rebooted their universe with "The New 52." Jane Doe appeared at a bank posing as wealthy socialite Vivian Wenner. When her accountant stated that Vivian Wenner is legally dead and cannot access her accounts, a shootout occurs that attracted the attention of Batman. Jane Doe gives Batman the slip and was saved by the villain Wrath. Wrath then persuades Jane Doe to take a disguise that can enable her to infiltrate the Gotham City Police Department. When Batman confronts Harvey Bullock, he deduces that he is not the real Bullock as Jane Doe sheds her disguise. When Jane Doe is weakened by the ensuing fight, she is taken down by psychiatrist Dr. Abigail Wilburn as she and Batman discover the real Bullock locked in the basement. When remanded to Arkham Asylum, Jane Doe chooses Batman as her next target. Harvey later visits Arkham Asylum and learns that Dr. Wilburn is now Jane Doe's appointed psychotherapist when he goes to receive therapy for his trauma. In truth, Jane Doe was actually conversing with herself while being observed by Arkham doctors.

Powers and abilities
Jane Doe is driven by a psychological need to "become" other people, and thus is highly skilled at assuming the identities of anyone she chooses. Her choice method is removing her victim's skin and hair, wearing them over her own body, and then perfectly mimicking her victim's voice. Jane's disguises are usually near-perfect; she was able to spend two months impersonating Dr. Anne Carver before being discovered by Batman. Underneath her disguises, Jane's real appearance is that of a woman without her own skin, only muscle and tissue. Jane is skilled at hand-to-hand combat and is an expert at psychological manipulation and strategy.

In other media

Television
Jane Doe makes her live-action debut in the Gotham episode "Nothing's Shocking," portrayed by Sarah Pidgeon. This version, named Jane Cartwright, is a woman who made a testimony about her mother Victoria shooting her abusive husband. While incarcerated at Arkham Asylum, she was taken below to the Indian Hill facility and experimented on by Hugo Strange, gaining her shapeshifting powers. Under the psychological delusion that her real face had been hideously disfigured by the experiments, she wore a mask at all times. After escaping, Jane sought revenge against the police officers who had put her mother away, and started by killing detectives Boggs and Lewis at the Sirens while posing as Dix. When James Gordon and Harvey Bullock questioned Dix at his home, Jane arrived and attempted to kill him, fleeing after Bullock removed her Dix disguise. Gordon and Bullock initially suspected Basil as the killer. When hiding out at her family home, Jane ambushed and posed as a police officer that accompanied Gordon and Vanessa Harper. When Gordon attacked her, Jane regressed back to normal as she didn't want Gordon to see her face. At the Gotham City Police Department, Jane stated her side of the story and how she got her powers while stating that Jane Cartwright had "died in Arkham." When Gordon stepped out, Jane used her powers to free herself from her restraints. She killed Dix while posing as Bullock, and escaped the precinct while disguised as Barbara Kean. Bullock confronted Jane at her house. After being persuaded to remove her mask by Bullock, Jane stated that only one of them would leave the room alive, and raised her gun. This forced Bullock to put an end to her life first.

The Jane Doe of Earth-99 is mentioned in episode two of the five-part Arrowverse crossover event "Crisis on Infinite Earths". According to Bruce Wayne of Earth-99, she is a shapeshifter incarcerated in Arkham Asylum.

Other
 Jane Doe appears as a summonable character in Scribblenauts Unmasked: A DC Comics Adventure.

References

External links
 Jane Doe at DC Wiki

Comics characters introduced in 2003
DC Comics female supervillains
Characters created by Dan Slott
Fictional actors
Fictional serial killers